Hitman is a 1997 action film directed by R. Dani as Roberto Roarke, starring Danny O'Meara, Todd Edwards, and Phil Novak.

Plot 

Lucky Delon is a prizefighter who is approached by a gangster, BMF, to throw his next fight. Refusing to be intimidated, Lucky knocks his opponent out and skips town. There is no escape for Lucky, when the gangster's henchman catches up with him. Unless he makes amends by doing a hit, he is dead. Faced with no choice, Lucky goes to a bar, where he meets Harvey "The Hitman" Roach, a professional killer who instructs Lucky in the art of being a hitman. But just as Lucky is getting used to having a hitman for a mentor, the BMF springs a new trap that results in a violent and bloody showdown.

External links
 

1997 films
1997 crime thriller films
British martial arts films
1997 martial arts films
1990s English-language films
1990s British films